José María López Lledín was an elegant vagabond known as El Caballero de París ("The Gentleman From Paris") who wandered the streets of Havana and was a well-known cult figure.

Biography
José María, the fourth of eleven children, was born at 11 a.m. on 30 December, 1899. Traveling in the German passenger ship S.S. Chemnitz, he arrived in Havana at twelve years of age on 12 December, 1913. His mother was Josefa Lledín Mendes and his father was Manuel Lopez Rodriguez; the owners of a small vineyard, they produced and sold wine and Sherry. He was baptized in the Parish of Salvador de Negueira.

According to his sister Inocencia, he worked as a tailor and in a bookshop. Later he worked as a waiter in the hotels Inglaterra, Telegrafo, Sevilla, Manhattan, Royal Palm and Saratoga.

There are many stories as to why he lost his mental sanity but all of them converge on the fact that he was imprisoned in the Castillo del Príncipe in 1920 for a crime he did not commit.

Mental disorder
He was late in life diagnosed as suffering from paraphrenia, a late-onset mental disorder featuring such symptoms as delusions and hallucinations; it does not have any negative symptoms such as the deterioration of the intellect or of the personality.  He was a patient of Mazorra, the Psychiatric Hospital of Havana.

Aristocracy
Anybody that lived in Havana in the 1950s remembers El Caballero de París. Architect Cheo Malanga writes about the one time that he saw him:

Recognitions
 A danzón by Antonio María Romeo, with the title El Caballero de París" with the refrain "Mira quien viene por ahí, El Caballero de París!".
 Statue of the Knight of Paris. A life-size bronze figure created by the Cuban sculptor José Villa Soberón. It was placed on the pavement of the Basílica Menor de San Francisco de Asís in Old Havana, at the initiative of the Historian of the City, Eusebio Leal.

 Documentary entitled: "Caballero de La Habana" (the true story of the Knight of Paris)", which uncovers the true story of a character symbol of Havana, the Knight of Paris, who in reality was Xosé María López LLedín, a native of Lugo, Galicia (©AS Video Cuba, 1998) Dir. Natasha Vazquez y Rigoberto Senarega.
 In the lyrics of the song "Cuba que lindo son tus paisajes" composed by the Cuban singer Willy Chirino, from the album Cuba Libre (1998), the Caballero de París is mentioned. 
 In 2013, Cuban singers Descemer Bueno and Kelvis Ochoa performed a musical inspired by José María López Lledín, the legendary Havana character known as "El Caballero de París", with choreography by Eduardo Blanco.

References

Further reading 

 Luis Calzadilla Fierro (2001). Yo soy el Caballero de París. Badajoz, España: Editorial Departamento de Publicaciones de la Diputación de Badajoz.

Gallery

External links
A more detailed account and pictures from his appearance on TV
 (in Spanish)
 (in Spanish)
Barbarito Diez El Caballero de Paris
Astrological Chart
Facebook Page
María Argelia Vizcaíno.  El Caballero de París.

1899 births
1985 deaths
People from the Province of Lugo
Street people
Spanish emigrants to Cuba